David Bergen (born January 14, 1957) is a Canadian novelist. He has published nine novels and two collections of short stories since 1993 and is currently based in Winnipeg, Manitoba, Canada. His 2005 novel The Time in Between won the Scotiabank Giller Prize and he was a finalist again in 2010 (for The Matter With Morris) and 2020 (for Here the Dark), making the long list in 2008 (for The Retreat).

Life and career
Bergen was born on January 14, 1957, in Port Edward, a small fishing village in British Columbia, Canada, and later grew up in the small town of Niverville, Manitoba. He went to Bible college in British Columbia and Red River College in Winnipeg, Manitoba, where he studied creative communication. He taught English and Creative Writing at Winnipeg's Kelvin High School until 2002.

Raised Mennonite, Bergen has noted that the tendency of the church to stifle questions and criticism affected his decision to write fiction. "Writing is a way of figuring things out," he says. "If you can't ask certain questions in church, maybe you can ask them in fiction."

His debut novel, A Year of Lesser in 1996, was a New York Times Notable Book and winner of the McNally Robinson Book of the Year Award. His 2002 novel The Case of Lena S. was a finalist for the Governor General's Award for English-language fiction, and won the Carol Shields Winnipeg Book Award. It was also a finalist for the McNally Robinson Book of the Year Award, and the Margaret Laurence Award for Fiction.

His 2005 novel The Time in Between won the Scotiabank Giller Prize, received a coveted starred review in the Kirkus Reviews trade magazine, and was recently longlisted for the 2007 International Dublin Literary Award. In 2008, he published his fifth novel, The Retreat, which was longlisted for the Scotiabank Giller Prize, and which won the McNally Robinson Book of the Year Award, and the Margaret Laurence Award for Fiction. In 2010, he was shortlisted again for the Scotiabank Giller Prize for his sixth novel, The Matter with Morris, which was also shortlisted for the 2012 International Dublin Literary Award.

He is also the author of a collection of short fiction, Sitting Opposite My Brother (1993), which was a finalist for the Manitoba Book of the Year. His most recent short story collection, Here the Dark, was published in 2020, and was shortlisted for the Giller Prize and the 2021 ReLit Award for short fiction.

Bibliography

Novels
 A Year of Lesser, HarperCollins Canada, 1996
 See the Child, HarperCollins Canada, 1999
 The Case of Lena S., McClelland & Stewart, 2002
 The Time in Between, McClelland & Stewart, 2005
 The Retreat, McClelland & Stewart, 2008
 The Matter With Morris, HarperCollins Canada, 2010
 The Age of Hope, HarperCollins Canada, 2012
 Leaving Tomorrow, HarperCollins Canada, 2014
 Stranger, HarperCollins Canada, 2016
 Out of Mind, Goose Lane Editions, 2021

Short stories
 Sitting Opposite My Brother, Turnstone Press, 1993
 Here the Dark, Stories and a Novella, Biblioasis, March, 2020

Awards
 1993 Finalist, Manitoba Book of the Year — Sitting Opposite My Brother 
 1996 John Hirsch Award — A Year of Lesser
 1996 McNally Robinson Book of the Year Award — A Year of Lesser
 1999 CBC Literary Award, Short Story — How Can 'N' Men Share a Bottle of Vodka
 2002 Short list, Governor General's Award — The Case of Lena S.
 2002 Carol Shields Winnipeg Book Award — The Case of Lena S.
 2002 Finalist, McNally Robinson Book of the Year Award — The Case of Lena S.
 2002 Finalist, Margaret Laurence Award for Fiction — The Case of Lena S.
 2005 Giller Prize  — The Time in Between
 2005 McNally Robinson Book of the Year Award — The Time in Between
 2007 Long list, International Dublin Literary Award — The Time in Between
 2008 Long list, Giller Prize — The Retreat
 2008 McNally Robinson Book of the Year Award — The Retreat
 2008 Margaret Laurence Award for Fiction — The Retreat
 2010 Shortlist, Giller Prize — The Matter With Morris
 2012 Shortlist, International Dublin Literary Award — The Matter with Morris
 2013 The Age of Hope chosen for Canada Reads - Defended by Ron Maclean
 2016 Longlist, Scotiabank Giller Prize - Stranger
 2018 Matt Cohen Award
 2020 Shortlist, Scotiabank Giller Prize - Here the Dark
 2021 McNally Robinson Book of the Year Award - Here the Dark
 2022 McNally Robinson Book of the Year Award - Out of Mind

References

External links
Description of David Bergen's archives at the University of Manitoba Archives & Special Collections 
David Bergen's entry in The Canadian Encyclopedia
Profile at Manitoba Writers' Guild

Canadian Mennonites
Canadian male novelists
Writers from British Columbia
1957 births
Living people
Mennonite writers
People from the North Coast Regional District
People from Eastman Region, Manitoba
20th-century Canadian novelists
21st-century Canadian novelists
20th-century Canadian male writers
21st-century Canadian male writers
Writers from Winnipeg